Boyko Velichkov (born 4 February 1974) is a Bulgarian football manager and former player who played as an attacking midfielder.

Club career
Velichkov began his playing career with CSKA Sofia. He later played for Yantra Gabrovo, Litex Lovech, Levski Sofia, Velbazhd Kyustendil, Spartak Varna, Lokomotiv Sofia, German 2. Bundesliga club Rot-Weiß Oberhausen, Greek side Ilisiakos and Cherno More Varna, before ending his career with Spartak Varna in 2008.

Managerial career
Velichkov was employed as head coach of Botev Vratsa between December 2013 and June 2014.

External links
 Boyko Velichkov, Lokomotiv Mezdra, Attacking mid(C) – IMScouting 
 Profile at LevskiSofia.info

1974 births
Living people
Bulgarian footballers
Association football midfielders
First Professional Football League (Bulgaria) players
2. Bundesliga players
FC Yantra Gabrovo players
PFC CSKA Sofia players
PFC Litex Lovech players
PFC Levski Sofia players
PFC Velbazhd Kyustendil players
PFC Spartak Varna players
FC Lokomotiv 1929 Sofia players
Rot-Weiß Oberhausen players
PFC Cherno More Varna players
Bulgarian football managers